Nicodemus Township is a township in Graham County, Kansas, United States. At the 2000 census, its population was 52.

Geography
According to the USGS, it contains two cemeteries: Mount Olive and Nicodemus.

The streams of Sand Creek and Spring Creek run through this township.

References

External links
 City-Data.com

Townships in Graham County, Kansas
Townships in Kansas